Kyle Michael Waldrop (born November 26, 1991) is an American former professional baseball outfielder. He played in Major League Baseball (MLB) for the Cincinnati Reds.

Career
Waldrop attended Riverdale High School in Fort Myers, Florida and played American football and baseball. Waldrop was drafted by the Cincinnati Reds in the 12th round of the 2010 Major League Baseball Draft. He had been offered to play college football at the University of South Florida, but signed with the Reds for a $500,000 signing bonus and the Reds agreeing to pay for four years of college. Waldrop made his professional debut that season for the Arizona League Reds.

Minor leagues
In 2011, Waldrop played for the Billings Mustangs of the Pioneer League, and was ranked as the 21st overall prospect in the Reds' organization. In 2012, he played for the Class A Dayton Dragons. In 2013, Waldrop earned a promotion to the Advanced A Bakersfield Blaze. During the season with Bakersfield, he hit 21 home runs, which ranked second among all Reds minor leaguers. Additionally, from July 28 to August 10 of that year, Waldrop went on a 14-game hitting streak while batting .370.

2014 was a breakout year for Waldrop. He began the season in Bakersfield once again, and while there, had a great season and was named the MVP of the California League All-Star Game. He was then promoted to the Class AA Pensacola Blue Wahoos on June 18. Across 131 games in 2014 with Bakersfield and Pensacola, Waldrop batted .338/.385/.516 with 37 doubles, 14 home runs, 67 RBIs, and 14 stolen bases. He was named the Reds organization's Minor League Hitter of the Year, and following the end of the season played in the Arizona Fall League where he batted .300. On November 20, he was added to the 40-man roster.

In 2015, in AA and AAA for the Reds he batted 	.235/.267/.338. In 2016, in AAA for the Reds he batted .252/.300/.363.

Major Leagues

Cincinnati Reds
Waldrop made his MLB debut on August 2, 2015. In 23 at bats between 2015 and 2016, he batted .217/.250/.261.

He was made a free agent in November 2016.

Seattle Mariners
In December 2016, he signed a minor league contract with the Seattle Mariners. He elected free agency on November 6, 2017.

Independent Leagues

Lancaster Barnstormers & Retirement
On March 19, 2018, Waldrop signed with the Lancaster Barnstormers of the Atlantic League of Professional Baseball.

Waldrop announced his retirement on May 8, 2018.

References

External links

1991 births
Living people
Sportspeople from Fort Myers, Florida
Baseball players from Florida
Cincinnati Reds players
Arizona League Reds players
Billings Mustangs players
Dayton Dragons players
Bakersfield Blaze players
Pensacola Blue Wahoos players
Surprise Saguaros players
Louisville Bats players
Arkansas Travelers players
Tacoma Rainiers players
Lancaster Barnstormers players